St. Davids station is a commuter rail station located in the western suburbs of Philadelphia at 
the intersection of Chamounix Road & Glynn Lane, Wayne, Pennsylvania. Named for the nearby historic Episcopal church, the station is served by most Paoli/Thorndale Line trains. There is no ticket office at this station. There are 107 parking spaces at the station (57 SEPTA spaces, 50 non-SEPTA spaces). There are also 5 bike racks available that can accommodate up to 20 bikes. It is in Radnor Township.

St. Davids station is 13.7 track miles from Philadelphia's Suburban Station, and was originally built in 1890 by the Pennsylvania Railroad. The station depot was demolished in 1966 and replaced with the existing structure. In 2017, the average total weekday boardings at this station was 242, and the average total weekday alightings was 278.

There is currently an ongoing effort to raise funding for a planned restoration of the station shelters to their original 19th-century condition.  This restoration includes replacing later woodwork that utilized simple designs not matching original specifications, return of cast-iron Pennsylvania Railroad station signage, and repainting the station shelters to historically accurate colors.

Station layout
St. Davids has two low-level side platforms with pathways connecting the platforms to the inner tracks.

References

External links

 SEPTA - Saint Davids Station
 Chamounix Road entrance from Google Maps Street View

SEPTA Regional Rail stations
Former Pennsylvania Railroad stations
Philadelphia to Harrisburg Main Line
Radnor Township, Delaware County, Pennsylvania
Railway stations in Delaware County, Pennsylvania
Railway stations in the United States opened in 1890